Cauan Felipe de Almeida (born 8 February 1989) is a Brazilian football coach. He is the current interim manager of Internacional.

Career
Born in Betim, Minas Gerais, Cauan de Almeida began his career as a manager of the under-17 team of Betim. After working as a manager of the same category at Associação Mineira de Desenvolvimento Humano, he moved to Portugal in 2014, and was an assistant manager at F.C. Infesta.

Cauan de Almeida returned to Brazil in 2016, and moved back to AMDH's under-17 side. He was subsequently an assistant manager of Betinense before being named manager of the under-17 team of América Mineiro in 2017.

On 15 July 2019, after Felipe Conceição was named manager of América's first team, Cauan de Almeida was named his assistant. The following January, after Conceição left for Red Bull Bragantino, Cauan was named interim manager.

Cauan de Almeida was in charge of the club for two Campeonato Mineiro matches (two wins) before returning to his previous role after the appointment of Lisca; during the campaign, he also replaced Lisca on several opportunities due to the manager's suspension or illnesses. On 15 June, he was again interim after Lisca resigned.

On 27 July 2021, Cauan de Almeida moved to Vasco da Gama, again to work as Lisca's assistant. He became the permanent assistant manager of Internacional the following 7 January, before becoming the interim manager of the latter side on 15 April 2022, after manager Alexander Medina was sacked.

References

External links
América Mineiro profile 

1989 births
Living people
Sportspeople from Minas Gerais
Brazilian football managers
Campeonato Brasileiro Série A managers
América Futebol Clube (MG) managers
Sport Club Internacional managers